Porcellio novus is a species of woodlouse in the genus Porcellio belonging to the family Porcellionidae that can be found in Portugal and Spain.

References

Crustaceans described in 1936
Woodlice of Europe
Porcellionidae